Matīss Miknis (born 29 December 1992) is a Latvian bobsledder who competed for Latvia at the 2018 Winter Olympics.

References

External links

1992 births
Latvian male bobsledders
Living people
Bobsledders at the 2018 Winter Olympics
Bobsledders at the 2022 Winter Olympics
Olympic bobsledders of Latvia
People from Valmiera
21st-century Latvian people